Continental Engineering Corporation (CEC) is a large Taiwanese construction company.

History
The company was originally founded by Glyn T. H. Ing in 1941 as Wei Dah Corporation in Chungking, Sichuan. In 1945, the company was restructured to become Continental Engineering Corporation (CEC) and its headquarters was moved to Shanghai. It also set up branch offices in Nanking and Taipei. Towards the end of Chinese Civil War, CEC moved to Taiwan in 1948. In 1986, the company underwent restructuring movement from family-run business to become a modern and professionally managed corporation. In 1994, the company became a publicly-listed company on the Taiwan Stock Exchange (TWSE). In 2005, the company set up branch offices outside Taiwan in Hong Kong, India, Macau and Malaysia. In 2010, Continental Holdings Corporation (CHC) was established and publicly listed on TWSE. CEC was then delisted from the stock exchange and became a subsidiary of CHC.

CEC has successfully completed many significant infrastructure projects, including major civil construction works
involving viaducts, bridges, and tunnels for highway, metro, and railway projects. The company was also one of the
principal consortium investors and contractors for the US$17 billion Taiwan High Speed Rail, one of the world’s largest
Build, Operate, and Transfer (BOT) projects.

Projects
 Taipei Grand Mosque
 Tomb of Bai Chongxi
 Shilin Official Residence of Chiang Kai-shek
 Grand Hotel (Taipei)
 United States Taiwan Defense Command barracks
 Fu Jen Catholic University Gymnasium
 Saudi Arabia Ministry of Industry and Electricity Headquarters Building
 Taiwan High Speed Rail
 Taipei Metro Banqiao Line (TRTS)
 Taipei Metro Nangang Line (TRTS)
 Taipei Metro Neihu Line (TRTS)
 Taiwan Taoyuan International Airport Access Mass Rapid Transit System
 Taoyuan International Airport Airport rail link
 Delhi metro using 4 shield TBM's
 Jaipur Metro Phase 1B using two Robbins EPB machines
 Noida- Greater Noida metro.
 Malaysia Kuala Lumpur Metro KVMRT SBK Line Package C
 Contract SSG506 - Kai Tak - Hong Kong - Station Square
 Contract CV/2013/08 - Liantang/ Heung Yuen Wai Boundary Control Point - Contract 6 - Hong Kong
 Contract DC/2012/02 - Mui Wo - Hong Kong - Upgrading of Sewage Treatment Works
 Contract DC/2009/18- Stonecutters Island - Hong Kong - HATS Tunnel
 Contract KL/2014/01 - Kai Tak - Hong Kong - Development at Former Runway.

Major Current domestic Public Sector projects (As of March 31, 2021)

Shield tunnels of Song-Hu~Da-An, Shen-Mei~Da-An 345kv Power Cable Transmission Lines Design and Build Project

Contract CQ842 “Station LG02; LG02 to LG03, and LG02 to LG01 TBM Tunnels Civil Construction”

Taipei Metropolitan Area Rapid Transit System Wanda- Zhonghe- Shulin Line District Contract (Phase I) CQ840 Project

Taipei Metropolitan Area Rapid Transit System Wanda- Zhonghe- Shulin Line District Contract (Phase I) CQ850A Project

Contract C214 - South Tainan Station Southern section of the Tainan Railway Underground Project

Contract C211 - Tainan Northern section of the Tainan Railway Underground Project

Contract E of the Guanci Po-Ai Park Public Housing Development Project

Taoyuan MRT Green Line Contract GC01 - Elevated Viaduct Civil Turnkey Project

Taipei Nangang Depot Public Housing Design and Build Project

Taoyuan MRT Green Line Contract GC03 - Elevated Viaduct Civil Turnkey Project

Gallery of Images

See also
 List of companies of Taiwan
 Build-operate-transfer

References

Chinese companies established in 1945
Companies based in Taipei
Construction and civil engineering companies of Taiwan
Construction and civil engineering companies established in 1945
1945 establishments in Taiwan